Amine El Manaoui (born 20 November 1991) is a Moroccan middle-distance runner. At the 2012 Summer Olympics, he competed in the Men's 800 metres. He took fifth place in a semi-final of the 800 m at the 2015 World Championships in Athletics.  He also reached the semifinal at the 2013 World Championships in the 800 m.

He was born in El Kelaa des Sraghna.

References

External links

1991 births
Living people
People from El Kelaa des Sraghna
Moroccan male middle-distance runners
Olympic athletes of Morocco
Athletes (track and field) at the 2012 Summer Olympics
World Athletics Championships athletes for Morocco
21st-century Moroccan people